The Nemencha are a large tribal confederation of Berber and Arab inhabiting North Africa. They are composed of four clans, in a territory in Algeria that bears their name, the Plateau Nemencha. 
The Nemencha are neighbors of the Berber tribes Fraichiches, Kasserine, and Hammema Gafsa.

History 

According to Nemencha traditions, they are from the Jebel Cherchar, from where they were expelled in the Middle Ages by the Beni Barbar who still occupy the Wadi Bedjer of Zawiya to Ciar. They are as divided into four groups that speak the same dialect of Arabic. Their main village is Taberdga. 

After the Nemencha were completely expelled from Cherchar they become nomadic and formed three fractions: the Oulad, the Brarcha and Alaouna.

References

Berber peoples and tribes